Red Horse Beer is an extra-strong lager brewed by San Miguel Brewery.

Overview
Red Horse is the first extra-strong beer brand in the Philippines. It is a high-alcohol lager of the San Miguel Brewery, with an alcohol content of 6.9% abv.

It was once introduced in response to Asia Brewery. Red Horse comes is various sizes, including the flagship 500 (500ml, regular), the discontinued Colt (250ml), the smaller Stallion (330ml), in Litro (1000ml), and in cans (330ml).

There are bottles prior to 2000 that have the first and the previous logo of Red Horse Beer shows the horse with a smile. Another distinct mark of these old, rare bottles has the separate heels on the horseshoe, the word "Red Horse" in a stenciled font, and in the back information all printed in red instead of yellow. The information on the back may vary in very old, rare bottles with the previous packaging. These bottles are nicknamed "The Laughing/Happy Horse".

They exist, rarely on crates of the regular 500, Stallion and in some cases, in Litro. These "Laughing/Happy Horse" bottles exist because they recycle old bottles, with the previous packaging, which costs less than producing new bottles.

Awards and prizes

Red Horse Muziklaban
Red Horse Muziklaban is an annual rock band competition in the Philippines since 1999. It features young unsigned bands who compete for the grand prize of Php 1,000,000 and a recording contract. It is sponsored by the San Miguel Brewery to promote its Red Horse Beer.

References

External links
 Official website
 Red Horse Beer USA website

Beer in the Philippines
San Miguel Corporation brands
Philippine brands
Beer brands